Kona Town may refer to:
Kona Town (album), by Pepper
Kailua-Kona, Hawaii, an unincorporated community